The 1979 Round Australia Trial, officially the Repco Reliability Trial was the twelfth running of the Round Australia Trial. The rally took place between 5 and 19 August 1979. The event covered 19,000 kilometres around Australia. It was won by Peter Brock, Matt Philip and Noel Richards, driving a Holden Commodore.

Results

References

Rally competitions in Australia
Round Australia Trial
Round Australia Trial